DLM may refer to:

Organizations
 Democratic Left Movement (Lebanon)
 Deutsche Liga für Menschenrechte, the German League for Human Rights
 Divine Light Mission, a religious organization founded in 1960 in India
 Division Légère Mécanique, WWII French military unit
 DLM AG, Dampflokomotiv- und Maschinenfabrik, Swiss steam locomotive manufacturer

Technology
 Distributed lock manager in computer science
 DLM Forum, of European archivers
 Double-loop monocable, a type of ropeway technology
 Dynamic Line Management of ADSL telephone connection

Other uses 
 Dalaman Airport, Muğla, Turkey, IATA code
 Deca Loših Muzičara, Serbian rock band
 A song on James Blake's album Overgrown
 Dissemination Limiting Marker, Australian InfoSec term, see For Official Use Only#Australia

See also